The Philippines men's national squash team represents Philippines in international squash team competitions, and is governed by Squash Rackets Association of the Philippines.

Current team
 Robert Andrew Garcia
 Reymark Begornia
 David William Pelino
 Lydio Espinola Jr

Results

World Team Squash Championships

Asian Squash Team Championships

Asian Squash Federation

Asian Games

Southeast Asian Games

See also
 Squash Rackets Association of the Philippines
 World Team Squash Championships

References

Squash teams
Men's national squash teams
Squash